Vermont Technical College (Vermont Tech) is a public technical college in Vermont with its main campuses in Randolph Center, Williston and Norwich. In addition, there are regional campuses in Brattleboro and Bennington, and nursing campuses in six locations throughout the state.

The school is a part of the Vermont State Colleges, a consortium of Vermont's four public colleges, governed by a common board of trustees, chancellor and council of presidents, each college with its own president and deans.

In April 2020, Vermont State Colleges proposed to close the Vermont Technical College residential campus in Randolph as well as Northern Vermont University. The proposal was scrapped after facing public opposition, leading the Vermont State Colleges to instead announce it would merge Vermont Technical College and its other four-year colleges into the new unified Vermont State University in 2023.

Academics 
VTC offers master's, bachelor's and associate degrees. Its five schools include: Agriculture, Plant, & Animal Sciences; Engineering & Computing; General Education; Nursing & Health Professions; and Professional Studies & Management. The schools offer degrees in over 50 majors, which are varied and include automotive technology, nursing, business management, dairy farm management, and computer engineering.

Athletics 
The Vermont Tech athletic teams are called the Knights. The college is a member of the United States Collegiate Athletic Association (USCAA), primarily competing in the Yankee Small College Conference (YSCC) since the 2011–12 academic year. The Knights previously competed in the Sunrise Athletic Conference of the National Association of Intercollegiate Athletics (NAIA) from 2006–07 to 2010–11.

As of 2021, Vermont Tech competes in nine intercollegiate varsity sports: men's sports include basketball, cross country, soccer and track & field; while women's sports include basketball, cross country, soccer, track & field and volleyball.

Student radio station 
WVTC, Vermont Tech's 300-watt fully licensed radio station, broadcasts online and locally at 90.7 FM and can be heard online at www.wvtc.net. The station is located at Morey Hall on VTC's Randolph Center campus. WVTC is operated and maintained by the students of VTC through the school's Radio Club, and is financially supported by VTC Student Council.

CubeSat Lab 
The Vermont Tech CubeSat Lab launched its first satellite, the Vermont Lunar CubeSat, a 1U CubeSat on November 19, 2013. Intended to orbit for three to five years, the satellite was fully functional until reentry on November 21, 2015. Vermont Tech's CubeSat was the first successful satellite launched by a New England college or university. Vermont Tech subsequently aided in developing the flight software for the Lunar IceCube, a satellite intended for deployment as part of the NASA Space Launch System's first flight in 2022.

History
In 1806, the Vermont House of Representatives passed a law creating the Orange County Grammar School in Randolph.  The school provided education through the high school grades and by the 1850s its state mandate had expanded to include teacher training.  In 1866, Edward Conant, the principal of the Orange County Grammar School, expanded its course offerings to make it a full-fledged normal school for the education and training of teachers.  Later that year, the Vermont General Assembly passed legislation making the change official, and the school became the Randolph Normal School.

In 1910, the Randolph Normal School was selected by the legislature as the location for the Vermont School of Agriculture.  In 1957, technical courses were added to the curriculum, and the Vermont School of Agriculture was renamed the Vermont Agriculture and Technical Institute (VATI).  In 1962, VATI was authorized by the state to award associate degrees and became Vermont Technical College (VTC).  VTC began awarding bachelor's degrees in 1993 and master's degrees in 2015.

For many years, the Vermont public colleges have experienced financial stress and chronic underfunding.  Exacerbated by COVID-19, in April 2020, Vermont State Colleges system Chancellor Jeb Spaulding recommended closing the Vermont Technical College residential campus in Randolph as well as all operations/campuses of Northern Vermont University.  Under the proposal, some of the Vermont Tech academic programs would be consolidated in Williston. The proposal was abandoned after public opposition, with the Vermont State Colleges instead announcing it would merge its four-year schools as Vermont State University. Vermont Technical College's Randolph and Williston campuses will become the Vermont State Institute of Technology.

Notable people

Alumni
Charles Bayley Adams, Randolph Normal School graduate who served as an associate justice of the Vermont Supreme Court.
Harry H. Cooley, Secretary of State of Vermont, Vermont School of Agriculture graduate (1913) and faculty member.
Alexander Dunnett, Randolph Normal School graduate who served as US Attorney for Vermont, President of the Vermont Bar Association, a member of the Vermont Senate, and Caledonia County State's Attorney.
Eugene Frederick Ladd, 1877 Randolph Normal School graduate who served as a brigadier general in the United States Army
Norman H. McAllister, member of the Vermont House of Representatives and Vermont Senate
Robert A. Starr, member of the Vermont House of Representatives and Vermont Senate
Larry Townsend, member of the Vermont House of Representatives from Randolph

Faculty and administrators
Cary Brown, executive director of the Vermont Commission on Women and director of the Women in Technology Project at Vermont Technical College.
Abel E. Leavenworth, Union Army veteran of the American Civil War; principal of the normal schools that are now Vermont Technical College and Castleton State College, as well as Bolivar Academy in Bolivar, Missouri.

See also 
 List of colleges and universities in the United States
 List of colleges and universities in Vermont

Notes

References

External links 
 Official website
 Official athletics website

Vermont State Colleges
Randolph, Vermont
Public universities and colleges in Vermont
Organizations based in Vermont
Educational institutions established in 1866
Buildings and structures in Orange County, Vermont
Education in Orange County, Vermont
USCAA member institutions
1866 establishments in Vermont